In quantum field theory, correlation functions, often referred to as correlators or Green's functions, are vacuum expectation values of time-ordered products of field operators. They are a key object of study in quantum field theory where they can be used to calculate various observables such as S-matrix elements. They are closely related to correlation functions between random variables, although they are nonetheless different objects, being defined in Minkowski spacetime and on quantum operators.

Definition 

For a scalar field theory with a single field  and a vacuum state  at every event (x) in spacetime, the n-point correlation function is the vacuum expectation value of the time-ordered products of  field operators in the Heisenberg picture

Here  is the time-ordering operator for which orders the field operators so that earlier time field operators appear to the right of later time field operators. By transforming the fields and states into the interaction picture, this is rewritten as

Expanding  using its Taylor series, the n-point correlation function becomes a sum of interaction picture correlation functions which can be evaluated using Wick's theorem. A diagrammatic way to represent the resulting sum is via Feynman diagrams, where each term can be evaluated using the position space Feynman rules.

Meanwhile,  is given by the set of all possible diagrams with exactly  external legs. Since this also includes disconnected diagrams with vacuum bubbles, the sum factorizes into (sum over all bubble diagrams)(sum of all diagrams with no bubbles). The first term then cancels with the normalization factor in the denominator meaning that the n-point correlation function is the sum of all Feynman diagrams excluding vacuum bubbles

While not including any vacuum bubbles, the sum does include disconnected diagrams, which are diagrams where at least one external leg is not connected to all other external legs through some connected path. Excluding these disconnected diagrams instead defines connected n-point correlation functions

It is often preferable to work directly with these as they contain all the information that the full correlation functions contain since any disconnected diagram is merely a product of connected diagrams. By excluding other sets of diagrams one can define other correlation functions such as one-particle irreducible correlation functions.

In the path integral formulation, n-point correlation functions are written as a functional average 

They can be evaluated using the partition functional  which acts as a generating functional, with  being a source-term, for the correlation functions

Similarly, connected correlation functions can be generated using  as

Relation to the S-matrix 

Scattering amplitudes can be calculated using correlation functions by relating them to the S-matrix through the LSZ reduction formula

The significance of this formula becomes clear after the application of the Klein–Gordon operators to these external legs using

This is said to amputate the diagrams by removing the external leg propagators and putting the external states on-shell. All other off-shell contributions from the correlation function vanish. After integrating the resulting delta functions, what will remain of the LSZ reduction formula is merely a Fourier transformation operation where the integration is over the internal point positions  that the external leg propagators were attached to. In this form the reduction formula shows that the S-matrix is the Fourier transform of the amputated correlation functions with on-shell external states.

It is common to directly deal with the momentum space correlation function , defined through the Fourier transformation of the correlation function

where by convention the momenta are directed inwards into the diagram. A useful quantity to calculate when calculating scattering amplitudes is the matrix element  which is defined from the S-matrix via 

where  are the external momenta. From the LSZ reduction formula it then follows that the matrix element is equivalent to the amputated connected momentum space correlation function with properly orientated external momenta

For non-scalar theories the reduction formula also introduces external state terms such as polarization vectors for photons or spinor states for fermions. The requirement of using the connected correlation functions arises from the cluster decomposition because scattering processes that occur at large separations do not interfere with each other so can be treated separately.

See also
 Effective action
 Green's function (many-body theory)
 Partition function (mathematics)

References

Further reading
 Altland, A.; Simons, B. (2006). Condensed Matter Field Theory. Cambridge University Press.
 Peskin, M.; Schroeder, D.V. (2018) An Introduction to Quantum Field Theory. Addison-Wesley.

Quantum field theory
Covariance and correlation